125 Jahre die Toten Hosen: Auf dem Kreuzzug ins Glück (125 years of Die Toten Hosen: On the crusade to happiness) is the fifth studio album and a double album by the German punk band Die Toten Hosen. The title "125 Jahre..." comes from the ages of all band members combined.

CD 1 contains mostly original material; it includes 2 covers, on which Honest John Plain also plays. CD 2 includes B-sides, remixes, a cover, a skit ("Im Jet-Grill") and a 3-song "drama" about Willi, about whom two songs had already been written and released. Before, between and after the Willi songs Gerhard Polt talks about Willi, playing different characters.

Track listing

CD 1

CD 2

Personnel 
 Campino – vocals
 Andreas von Holst – guitar
 Michael Breitkopf – guitar
 Andreas Meurer – bass
 Wolfgang Rohde – drums

Charts

References 

Die Toten Hosen albums
1990 albums
German-language albums
Virgin Records albums